The 2010–11 CEV Women's Champions League was the highest level of European club volleyball in the 2010–11 season and was the 37th edition.

Teams of the 2010–2011 competition
The number of participants on the basis of ranking list for European Cup Competitions:

 The drawing of lots for the main phase (group stage) of the competition was being held on 25 June 2010, in Vienna.

League round
20 teams were drawn to 5 pools of 4 teams each.
The 1st – 2nd and the two best 3rd ranked qualified for the Playoffs 12.
The organizer of the Final Four was determined after the end of the League Round and qualified directly for the Final Four.
The team of the organizer of  the Final Four was replaced by the 3rd ranked team with the best score.
The two next  3rd and two best 4th ranked teams moved to CEV Cup. The remaining teams were eliminated.

Pool A

November 23–25, 2010

December 1, 2010

December 7–8, 2010

December 15–16, 2010

January 4–6, 2011

January 11, 2011

Pool B

November 25, 2010

November 30– December 2, 2010

December 7–8, 2010

December 13, 2010

January 6, 2011

January 11, 2011

Pool C

November 23–24, 2010

December 1, 2010

December 8, 2010

December 15–16, 2010

January 4–6, 2011

January 11, 2011

Pool D

November 23–25, 2010

November 30, 2010

December 9, 2010

December 14–15, 2010

January 4–5, 2011

January 11, 2011

Pool E

November 24, 2010

November 30– December 2, 2010

December 8–9, 2010

December 14–16, 2010

January 5–6, 2011

January 11, 2011

Playoffs 12
In case of a tie - 1 match won and 1 match lost and not depending on the final score of both matches - the teams played a golden set to determine which one qualified for the next round.

1Muszynianka Muszyna won the golden set 15–11.
2Rabita Baku won the golden set 15–11.
3Voléro Zürich won the golden set 15–9.

First leg
February 1–3, 2011

Second leg
February 8–10, 2011

Playoffs 6
In case of a tie - 1 match won and 1 match lost and not depending on the final score of both matches - the teams have to play a golden set to determine which one qualifies for the next round.

First leg
February 23–24, 2011

Second leg
March 3, 2011

Final four
The final four was held at 19–20 March 2011 at Istanbul, Turkey. Fenerbahçe Acıbadem was qualified as the organizer.

Bracket

Semi-final
March 19, 2011

Third-place game
March 20, 2011

Final
March 20, 2011

Final standing

Individual awards
Winners:
 MVP:  /  VakıfBank Güneş TTelekom
Best Blocker: /  VakıfBank Güneş TTelekom
Best Libero:  /  VakıfBank Güneş TTelekom
Best Receiver: /  VakıfBank Güneş TTelekom
Best Scorer: /  VakıfBank Güneş TTelekom
Best Server: /  Rabita Baku
Best Setter: /  VakıfBank Güneş TTelekom
Best Spiker:  /  Scavolini Pesaro

References

External links 

Champions League

CEV Women's Champions League
CEV Women's Champions League
CEV Women's Champions League
Women's CEV Champions League
League 2010
2010–11